The rugby sevens at the 2010 Commonwealth Games was the fourth Commonwealth Games at which rugby sevens was played.

Rugby sevens was one of only two sports contested only by males with no women's competition (the other being boxing). The rugby competition was held between 11 and 12 October 2010. The competition venue was the Delhi University Stadium within North Campus of the Delhi University.

Namibia withdrew and was later replaced by Malaysia. Due to the withdrawal, Uganda was shifted to Group D while Malaysia was placed in Group C.

Fiji, described as "perennial crowd favourites", was absent, due to the country being suspended from the Commonwealth following the 2006 military coup.

There were security and health concerns surrounding the 2010 Commonwealth Games, but many main competitors had confirmed their participation.

Qualified teams

Group A

Group B

Group C

Group D

Knockout stage

Gold Medal Bracket

Plate

Bowl

Medalists

References

External links
 archive of 2010 Commonwealth Games site

2010 Commonwealth Games events
2010
Rugby union in India
Commonwealth